The Château Moncade is a ruined castle in the commune of Orthez in the Pyrénées-Atlantiques département of France.

History
Construction of the castle was started in 1242 by the Gaston VII, Viscount of Béarn (the keep, known as the tour de Moncade) taking advantage of the absence of Edward III. When the King returned, Gaston was imprisoned and had to swear allegiance before being released. He subsequently reneged.

It was the residence of the Kings of Béarn when their capital was Orthez. Entry was by a drawbridge.

In the 14th century, Gaston Phébus, Count of Foix, altered it between 1368 and 1375.

The castle was burned during the Wars of Religion in 1569. It was sold during the French Revolution to dismantlers who largely demolished the curtain wall.

The only remains are the keep (in a good state of preservation), the moats (in course of restoration) and remnants of the curtain wall. It has been listed since 1840 as a monument historique by the French Ministry of Culture.

Visits
The castle is open to the public (paying) and contains, among other items, a model of the site.

Gallery

See also
List of castles in France

References

External links
 

Pyrénées-Atlantiques
Monuments historiques of Nouvelle-Aquitaine
Ruined castles in Nouvelle-Aquitaine
Maisons des Illustres